The 1930 Railway Cup Hurling Championship was the fourth series of the inter-provincial hurling Railway Cup. One match was played on 17 March 1930 to decide the title. It was contested by Leinster and Munster.

Munster entered the championship as the defending champions.

On 17 March 1930, Munster won the Railway Cup after a 4-06 to 2-07 defeat of Leinster in the final at Croke Park, Dublin. This was their second title over all and their third title in succession.

Munster's Tommy Treacy was the Railway Cup top scorer with 3-00.

Teams

Results

Final

Sources

 Donegan, Des, The Complete Handbook of Gaelic Games (DBA Publications Limited, 2005).

External links
 Munster Railway Cup-winning teams

Railway Cup Hurling Championship
Railway Cup Hurling Championship